The 1992 Volvo Women's Open was a women's tennis tournament played on outdoor hard courts at the Dusit Resort Hotel in Pattaya City in Thailand that was part of Tier V of the 1992 WTA Tour. It was the second edition of the tournament and was held from 13 April through 19 April 1992. Eighth-seeded Sabine Appelmans won the singles title and earned $18,000 first-prize money.

Finals

Singles
 Sabine Appelmans defeated  Andrea Strnadová 7–5, 3–6, 7–5
 It was Appelmans' 1st singles title of the year and the 3rd of her career.

Doubles
 Isabelle Demongeot /  Natalia Medvedeva defeated  Pascale Paradis /  Sandrine Testud 6–1, 6–1

References

External links
 ITF tournament edition details
 Tournament draws

 WTA Tour
 in women's tennis
Tennis, WTA Tour, Volvo Women's Open
Tennis, WTA Tour, Volvo Women's Open

Tennis, WTA Tour, Volvo Women's Open
1992 Volvo Women's Open